The 2019 Malaysia Cricket World Cup Challenge League A was the inaugural edition of Group A of the 2019–2022 ICC Cricket World Cup Challenge League, a cricket tournament which formed part of the qualification pathway to the 2023 Cricket World Cup. In July 2019, the International Cricket Council (ICC) confirmed that the Malaysia Cricket Association would host the tournament. The series took place between 16 and 26 September 2019, with all the matches having List A status.

On the penultimate day of the tournament, Vanuatu were bowled out for 65 runs against Malaysia. In reply, Vanuatu managed to dismiss Malaysia for 52 runs, recording the lowest team total defended by any side in a List A cricket match.

Canada won the series, after finishing ahead of Singapore on net run rate, with both teams level on points.

Squads

Prior to the series, Inam-ul-Haq and Tamoor Sajjad were ruled out of Qatar's squad due to personal reasons.

Fixtures

References

External links
 Series home at ESPN Cricinfo

International cricket competitions in 2019–20
International cricket competitions in Malaysia
Cricket World Cup Challenge League A